Elizabeth Hamill Maconachie OBE, known as Bessie Maconachie, was a unionist politician in Northern Ireland.

Maconachie studied at Queen's University Belfast, then worked as a schoolteacher.  At the 1953 Northern Ireland general election, she was elected to the House of Commons of Northern Ireland as an Ulster Unionist Party (UUP) MP for the Queen's University of Belfast seat.  One of only a very few women to serve at Stormont, she held her seat until its abolition in 1969.  She was on the more liberal wing of the UUP, and favoured some reform.

Maconachie was a member of the National Federation of Business and Professional Women's Clubs of Great Britain and Northern Ireland, In the 1970s, Maconachie served as Chairman of the Unionist Society. She as appointed OBE in the 1976 New Year Honours.

References

Year of birth missing
Year of death missing
Alumni of Queen's University Belfast
Officers of the Order of the British Empire
Women members of the House of Commons of Northern Ireland
Ulster Unionist Party members of the House of Commons of Northern Ireland
Members of the House of Commons of Northern Ireland for Queen's University of Belfast
Members of the House of Commons of Northern Ireland 1953–1958
Members of the House of Commons of Northern Ireland 1958–1962
Members of the House of Commons of Northern Ireland 1962–1965
Members of the House of Commons of Northern Ireland 1965–1969